Alfredo Mostarda Filho, simply known as Alfredo (born on October 18, 1946, in São Paulo) is a former Brazilian footballer who played as a defender.

In a long career (from 1966–1984) he played for Palmeiras, Cruzeiro, Nacional (AM), Coritiba, Santos, and ending up in Bolivia with team Jorge Wilstermann.  He won two Campeonatos Brasileiros Série A (1972, 1973) and two Campeonatos Paulistas (1972, 1974) with Palmeiras.  For the Brazilian team he played twice, both in 1974, and his second match for Brazil came at the 1974 FIFA World Cup in a 0-1 loss against the Poland team.

References

1946 births
Living people
Brazilian footballers
Brazilian expatriate footballers
1974 FIFA World Cup players
Campeonato Brasileiro Série A players
Cruzeiro Esporte Clube players
Sociedade Esportiva Palmeiras players
Coritiba Foot Ball Club players
Santos FC players
Brazil international footballers
C.D. Jorge Wilstermann players
Expatriate footballers in Bolivia
Brazilian expatriate sportspeople in Bolivia
Association football defenders